Rainbow Railroad is a Canadian charitable organization that helps lesbian, gay, bisexual, transgender, queer, and intersex (LGBTQI) individuals escape violence and persecution in their home countries. In the past, they have helped individuals from the Caribbean, Central and South America, Eastern Europe, the Middle East and Africa through emergency travel support and other forms of assistance. The organization was formed in 2006, with its name and concept inspired by the Underground Railroad that was used by African-American slaves to escape into free states. Since 2006, Rainbow Railroad has helped over 3100 LGBTQ+ people from around the world find safety. It received charitable status from the Canada Revenue Agency in 2013, and received 501(c)(3) charity organization status in 2015. The organization is based in Toronto and New York City.  

After the revelations about the anti-gay purges and concentration camps in Chechnya (and on a smaller scale in neighboring Ingushetia and Dagestan), Rainbow Railroad began to mobilize emergency efforts to help LGBT people get out of the region in collaboration with the Russian LGBT Network. 

After the fall of Kabul to the Taliban in August 2021, Rainbow Railroad raised concerns about the situation for LGBTQ people living under the Taliban.  Between August 2021 and June 2022, Rainbow Railroad helped to resettle 247 LGBTQ+ Afghans in Canada, the U.K., and Ireland.

Rainbow Railroad's main goal is to help those who identify with the LGBTQ+ community. Their mission is to save those who cannot be themselves openly in their country and bring them to a new country where they can be who they truly are. Rainbow Railroad believes that governments around the globe should enact and enforce laws and policies that protect LGBTQ+ individuals and enable them to live in freedom and safety in their own country. However, until that day arrives, the organization is focused on providing solutions for LGBTQ+ people who need immediate assistance because they are facing a serious threat to their lives and safety.

Recognition
Rainbow Railroad received the 2018 Bonham Centre Award from the Mark S. Bonham Centre for Sexual Diversity Studies at the University of Toronto for its work helping LGBT refugees.

In 2019, Time magazine published a feature on Rainbow Railroad's work supporting those impacted by the anti-gay purge in Chechnya. Approximately 70 Chechen men were resettled by Rainbow Railroad during this time period.

In 2020, their work was highlighted in an episode of Canada's Drag Race. During the eighth episode of the season which aired on August 20, five gay men who had moved to Canada through the organization were given drag makeovers as the main challenge for the week. The winner of this challenge, Priyanka, won a $10,000 donation to Rainbow Railroad in her name.

In 2021, Rainbow Railroad were recognised with the GAY TIMES Honour for International Community Trailblazer at the fifth annual GAY TIMES Honours celebration in London. Rainbow Railroad Executive Director Kimahli Powell accepted the award, which was presented by LGBTQ+ and human rights activist Blair Imani.

References

External links
 
 Video segment & Transcript of report on 60 Minutes (CBS news magazine)
Video segment on Who They Help: Ray

Persecution of LGBT people
LGBT political advocacy groups in Canada
Refugee aid organizations in Canada
Organizations established in 2006
2006 establishments in Ontario
Charities based in Canada
501(c)(3) organizations
Human rights organizations based in Canada